Leslie Jones (8 December 1922 – 1983) was a Welsh amateur footballer who played in the Football League for Millwall as an inside forward. He was capped by Wales at amateur level.

References 

Welsh footballers
English Football League players
Wales amateur international footballers
Association football inside forwards
1922 births
People from Ynysybwl
Sportspeople from Rhondda Cynon Taf
1983 deaths
Barry Town United F.C. players
Millwall F.C. players